Orders of Magnitude is an album by American synthpop band Information Society released on March 11, 2016.

The tracks include cover versions of the Human League's "Don't You Want Me" and the Sisters of Mercy's "Dominion". "We were powerfully affected by these songs, and now we echo that effect back out", said the group in comments at a press conference in Davos, Switzerland, timed to coincide with the World Economic Forum meeting that took place there that week.

Track listing

Personnel
 Kurt Harland
 Paul Robb
 James Cassidy

References

External links
 Bandcamp store
 Official Site

Information Society (band) albums
2016 albums
Covers albums